Dewdrops in the Garden is the third and final studio album by American dance music band Deee-Lite, released in August 1994 via Elektra Records. The album saw the group move away from the overtly political lyrical content of the previous album, shifting into themes of dance and intimacy with a heavier lean into psychedelic music.

Background
At the time of the release of Dewdrops in the Garden, Lady Kier had compared it to Infinity Within, saying:

The album drew inspiration from Lady Kier's travels to the Hopi ruins in the Painted Desert and pyramids in the Yucatan and Dmitry's travels to the Grand Canyon and Joshua Tree. The inspiration was clear in Lady Kier's description of the track "Music Selector is the Soul Reflector":

Most of the work on Dewdrops in the Garden was done by Super DJ Dmitry and Lady Miss Kier joined by Kansan producer Ani Schempf (DJ Ani, also known as DJ On-E and DJ Ani Quinn). Towa Tei had left the band to do some work on Japanese pop star Nokko's album and his own debut solo album Future Listening!, and he was said to be back for the band's fourth album, which was never made. Even through his absence, Tei contributed various production to the tracks "Call Me", "Party Happening People", "DMT (Dance Music Trance)", and the "Funky Chunky Bonus Beats" portion of "What is This Music?".

Shortly after the album's release, a companion album titled Dewdrops in the Remix containing four remixes of "Picnic in the Summertime," four mixes of "Bring Me Your Love," and six mixes of "Call Me" was released in Japan. "Bring Me Your Love" and "Call Me" became their last two #1 hits on the Hot Dance Music/Club Play chart.

Track listing
All tracks written by Deee-Lite.

The song "What is This Music?" ends at minute 0:29. After exactly four minutes of silence begins an untitled spoken word sample as a brief hidden track, beginning at 4:29 and ending at 4:39. After approximately two minutes of silence begins another hidden track—an instrumental song known as "Party Happening People (Funky Chunky Bonus Beats)", previously only released on an obscure 12" vinyl test pressing of "Party Happening People"—beginning at 6:41 and ending at 10:03. After a further two minutes of silence, the final hidden track begins, "Bring Me Your Love (Johnny Vicious Cosmic Isness Remix 1)" from the 12" vinyl release of "Bring Me Your Love", beginning at 12:03 and ending at 17:50, closing off both the track and the album.

Chart performance

Personnel

Deee-Lite
Kierin Kirby – vocals
Dmitry Brill – keyboards, bass, drum programming, guitar, piano
Towa Tei – drum programming (8, 14, 16), bass (8, 15), keyboards (8)
Ani Schempf – keyboards, drum programming, scratching (1, 6, 11, 12, 16)

Additional Personnel
Chillblast – beatbox (1, 5, 15)
Joe Ruddick – keyboards (2, 7, 12)
Kenny "Dope" Gonzales – keyboards (3)
"Little" Louie Vega – keyboards (3)
Angelica Galvez – additional vocals (1, 5)
Zhana Saunders – backing vocals (3)
Johnny Vicious – remix (16)

Production
Deee-Lite - arranger, mixing, producer
Armand Van Helden – digital editing
Fernando Aponte - mixing, assistant engineer
Robert Rives - mixing, assistant engineer
Brian Miller - assistant engineer
Jimmie Lee - assistant engineer
Steve Barkan - assistant engineer
Carlos Soul Slinger - assistant engineer
Rob Vaughan Merrick - assistant engineer
Heather "Aquasonic" Sommerfield - art direction
Kier Kirby - art direction, design
Alli Truch - artwork
Rex Ray - design
Joshua Jordan - photography
James Minchin III - additional photography
Tom Pitts - additional photography
Nancy Jeffries - executive producer
Rick Essig - mastering
Reese Williams - additional production

References

Deee-Lite albums
1994 albums
Elektra Records albums
Funk albums by American artists